Jón Ólafsson of Grunnavík (Jón Ólafsson frá Grunnavík, also known as Jón Grunnvíkingur or Grunnavíkur-Jón, 1705–1779) was an Icelandic scholar. Originally  from Grunnavík, Westfjords, northwestern Iceland, he was active in Copenhagen, where he served as assistant to Árni Magnússon.

He is the author of an Icelandic dictionary and a 1732 Runologia, a treatise on runology.  As in the fire of Copenhagen of 1728, the original manuscript of the Heiðarvíga saga was lost along with a recent copy made by Jón Grunnvíkingur, he wrote down a summary of the saga from memory, which is the only form in which the saga's contents survive today.

The character of Jón Grindvicensis in Halldór Laxness's historical novel  Iceland's Bell is based on Jón Grunnvíkingur.

References
 Jón Helgason, Jón Ólafsson frá Grunnavík, Copenhagen (1926)
 Magnússon, Fridrik and Gudrún Kvaran (eds.). Hræringur úr ritum Grunnavíkur-Jóns. Ordmennt og Gódvinir Grunnavíkur-Jóns. Reykjavík (1994).
 Ingólfsdóttir, G. and S. Sigmundsson (eds.). Vitjun sína vakta ber. Gódvinir Grunnavíkur-Jóns og Háskólaútgafan. Reykjavík (1999).

External links
 Words from Jón Ólafssons’s dictionary in manuscript
  Jón Ólafsson's Runologia

1705 births
1779 deaths
Icelandic scholars
Religious studies scholars
Sagas of Icelanders
18th-century Icelandic people